Nelbert Chouinard (born Nelbertina Murphy; 1879–1969) was an American artist who founded the Chouinard Arts Institute (1921) in Los Angeles, California. The Institute had a great influence on the arts and art education in Los Angeles, educating the artists and animators who made an impact on art in the twentieth century.

Education
Nelbert Murphy began her art education at Windom Institute in her hometown of Montevideo, Minnesota.  She was a 1904 graduate in fine art, from the Pratt Institute in New York.

Career

Teaching
After graduating from Pratt, she began her teaching career in the Orange, NJ public school system.  She spent her summers at home in Minnesota working with the Handicraft Guild in Minneapolis where she taught leather craft art under the guidance of Earnest Batchelder.  When her parents relocated from Minnesota to South Pasadena, California in 1909, Nelbert Murphy joined them and taught at Throop Polytechnic, now Caltech, with Ernest Batchelder. She was subsequently recruited to teach at the Otis Art Institute.

Founding the Chouinard Arts Institute
In 1921 Mrs. Chouinard founded the Chouinard Arts Institute.  The school became known by its distinguished roster of alumni as one of the great art schools in the world.  Throughout the 1930s and 1940s, through the Great Depression and WWII, Mrs. Chouinard managed to keep the school going.  Early on, Walt Disney recognized the school as a great resource for talent and hired the Institute to train his animation artists.  By 1962, Mrs. Chouinard, in failing health, was unable to continue at the helm and the school was in financial straits.  Walt Disney, Chouinard Art Institute board member, was asked by the other members of the board to take on the directorship in order to continue the school.  He agreed.  Under Disney, the school was renamed California Institute for the Arts (CalArts).

Personal life
Nelbert Murphy married Horace "Burt" Chouinard, widower and retired Spanish American War army chaplain, in 1916.  The couple lived briefly in El Paso, Texas and later in Washington, D.C.  When Horace Chouinard died of cancer only two years later, Nelbert M. Chouinard moved back to South Pasadena, California where she lived for the rest of her life.  She was known thereafter as "Mrs. Chouinard", never remarried and always wore her wedding ring.

References

1879 births
1969 deaths
Artists from Minneapolis
Pratt Institute alumni
20th-century American women artists
American women painters
Art in Greater Los Angeles
American designers